Hikari Nagashima (born 2 December 1993) is a Japanese professional footballer who plays as a defender for WE League club Omiya Ardija Ventus.

Club career 
Nagashima made her WE League debut on 12 September 2021.

References 

Living people
1993 births
Japanese women's footballers
Women's association football defenders
Association football people from Saitama Prefecture
Omiya Ardija Ventus players
WE League players